Mlungisi "Pro" Mdluli, previously Mlungisi Gumbi, (born 9 March 1980) is a South African former professional soccer 
player who played as a midfielder. He played for Maritzburg City, Golden Arrows and Orlando Pirates in the Premier Soccer League and won two caps for South Africa, including one at the 2006 African Cup of Nations.

External links

1980 births
Living people
South African soccer players
Sportspeople from Soweto
Soccer players from Gauteng
Association football midfielders
Orlando Pirates F.C. players
Lamontville Golden Arrows F.C. players
South African Premier Division players
South Africa international soccer players
2006 Africa Cup of Nations players